Tyrese Proctor (born 1 April 2004) is an Australian college basketball player for the Duke Blue Devils of the Atlantic Coast Conference (ACC).

Early life
Proctor was born in Sydney, New South Wales to an Australian mother and an American-born father. His father, Rod, is a former professional basketballer for the Sydney Kings in Australia's National Basketball League. Tyrese grew up playing an array of sports such as cricket, soccer and baseball but basketball was his highest priority throughout his upbringing. He began playing junior basketball for the Sutherland Sharks and represented his home state of New South Wales at numerous national championships. In 2021, Proctor received a scholarship to attend the NBA Global Academy in Canberra.

College career
In April 2022, Proctor committed to join Duke University for their upcoming 2022-23 season.

Career statistics

College

|-
| style="text-align:left;"| 2022–23
| style="text-align:left;"| Duke
| 34 || 32 || 29.2 || .381 || .324 || .866 || 3.1 || 3.2 || .6 || .1 || 9.3
|- class="sortbottom"
| style="text-align:center;" colspan="2"| Career
|| 34 || 32 || 29.2 || .381 || .324 || .866 || 3.1 || 3.2 || .6 || .1 || 9.3

National team career
In February 2022, Proctor made his debut for the Australian senior national team at 17 years of age in a  FIBA Asia Cup qualification game against Japan. He was selected to represent Australia in the FIBA Asia Cup in Indonesia later that year and played a starring role in his country's run to the gold medal.

References

External links
Duke Blue Devils bio
ESPN profile

2004 births
Living people
21st-century Australian people
Australian expatriate basketball people in the United States
Australian men's basketball players
Australian people of African-American descent
Basketball players from Sydney
Duke Blue Devils men's basketball players